Austrapoda hepatica is a species of moth of the family Limacodidae. It is found in Japan.

References

Limacodidae
Moths of Japan
Moths described in 1987